Keith Edward Watson (born 14 November 1989) is a Scottish footballer, who plays as a defender for Ross County.

A product of Dundee United's youth development system, Watson made his first team debut in January 2007. His early career was disrupted by injury problems, and he spent periods on loan to Forfar Athletic and East Fife before establishing himself in the Dundee United team in 2010; he was a member of the squad that won the Scottish Cup that year. Watson established himself as a regular in the right back position,  making his 100th league appearance in February 2014. He spent the latter part of the 2014–15 season on loan at Hibernian.

Watson signed for St Mirren in August 2015 and joined St Johnstone in 2016. He joined Hartlepool United on loan in August 2017, and after leaving St Johnstone in the 2018 close season he signed for Ross County.

Early life
Watson was born and brought up in Livingston, where he attended Deans Community High School. He played for Livingston Star Boys Club, a youth team run by his father, before joining the Dundee United youth system at under-14 level.

Career

Dundee United
Watson was included in the club's first team squad whilst still a youth signing,  being an unused substitute for United's last two matches of the 2005–06 season.  After signing his first professional contract in December 2006, Watson's debut for the Dundee United first team came in the Scottish Cup third round match against St Mirren in January 2007, when he played 85 minutes in a 3–2 victory. Following this victory, he was described by his then manager Craig Levein as "without fear of contradiction, the best young player I have ever worked with".

Watson, who made his first league appearance as a late substitute in March 2007, was due to start in the match against Celtic shortly afterwards but suffered a dislocated knee during the warm-up. Having featured in a handful of reserve matches throughout September 2008, manager Craig Levein stated he would be sent out on loan to continue his build-up to full fitness and was loaned to Forfar for a month in January 2009.
Suffering another knee dislocation in a practice match after playing his first match for Forfar, Watson's loan was extended after it was revealed he would return to playing within weeks,

In 2009, Watson agreed a contract extension with United until May 2012, going out on loan again in December to East Fife.

After returning from loan in March 2010, Watson was brought on as a 47th-minute substitute for Mihael Kovačević in a 1–0 Scottish Cup victory over Rangers. This opportunity lead to 11 appearances in the remainder of the season, culminating in a substitute appearance in the 2010 Scottish Cup Final victory against Ross County on 15 May 2010.

The 2010–11 season saw a breakthrough to regular first team football for Watson, making 34 appearances in total. His first goal was marked against Motherwell in a 4–0 win at Tannadice Park on 7 May 2011, where he also won man of the match. He scored his second Dundee United goal on 17 March 2012 against Rangers.

On 28 January 2015, Watson signed for Hibernian on loan until the end of the season to provide defensive cover for the Edinburgh side. Dundee United announced in April 2015 that Watson would be released when his contract expires at the end of the season.

St Mirren
Watson signed for St Mirren on a short-term deal in August 2015. His contract was extended in December 2015 to the end of the 2015–16 season.

St Johnstone
On 2 May 2016, it was announced that Watson had signed a pre-contract agreement with St Johnstone. The contract was for two years, keeping Watson at the club until the summer of 2018. After initially struggling with injuries after joining the club, Watson was subsequently unable to break into the team once Ricky Foster became established in the right back position. Having been restricted to six first team appearances in his first season, Watson joined English National League club Hartlepool United on loan in August 2017, until January 2018. After two injury-troubled seasons, St Johnstone announced that they would release Watson at the end of the 2017–18 season.

Ross County
Watson signed for Ross County during the 2018 close season. He won the Scottish Championship in his first season with Ross County. Watson was made club captain for the 2021-22 season. On 11 March 2022 Watson signed a new one-year contract keeping him at the club until 2023.

Career statistics

Honours

Club
Dundee United
Scottish Cup: 2009–10

Ross County
Scottish Championship: 2018–19
Scottish Challenge Cup: 2018–19

References

External links
 Official Dundee United FC website profile
 

1989 births
Living people
Sportspeople from Livingston, West Lothian
Footballers from West Lothian
Scottish footballers
Dundee United F.C. players
Forfar Athletic F.C. players
East Fife F.C. players
Hibernian F.C. players
St Mirren F.C. players
St Johnstone F.C. players
Association football defenders
Scottish Premier League players
Scottish Football League players
Scottish Professional Football League players
Hartlepool United F.C. players
National League (English football) players
Ross County F.C. players